Awami Awaz is a Sindhi daily newspaper and news TV channel in Pakistan. Its published from Karachi. The current chief editor of the newspaper is Jabbar Khattak.

References

External links
 

Mass media in Karachi
Sindhi-language newspapers
Daily newspapers published in Pakistan